My Brain Says Stop, But My Heart Says Go!, is the fourth studio album by Canadian pop punk band FM Static. The album was released on April 5, 2011, through Tooth & Nail Records. The first two singles from the record are "F.M.S.T.A.T.I.C." and "Last Train Home".

Track listing

References

2011 albums
FM Static albums
Tooth & Nail Records albums
Albums produced by Aaron Sprinkle